Earll is a surname, and may refer to:

 Jane Earll (born 1958), Pennsylvania politician
 Jonas Earll Jr. (1786–1846), US congressman from New York
 Nehemiah H. Earll (1787–1872), US congressman from New York
 R. Edward Earll (1853–1896), American ichthyologist
 Warner Earll (1814–1888), justice of the Supreme Court of Nevada

See also
 Earll v. State of Wyoming a textbook case on Harmless error
 Earl
 Earle (disambiguation)